Bwana Mkuu was  Sultan of Pate, Kenya, 1688 to 1713. At the time Pate dominated Lamu. Bwana Mkuu set up residency at Lamu, complete with a Lamu lady as one of his wives and a private mosque.

References

Sources
Martin, Chryssee MacCasler Perry and Esmond Bradley Martin:  Quest for the Past. An historical guide to the Lamu Archipelago. 1973.